Gunnar Dahlberg (1893–1956) was a Swedish physician, eugenist and geneticist.

From 1922 to 1924 he was the assistant of Herman Lundborg at Statens institut för rasbiologi. In 1935, when Lundborg retired, Dahlberg succeeded him as the head of the institute. Dahlberg held the post until his death in 1956 and was succeeded by the geneticist Jan Arvid Böök.

In September 1939, he was one of the signatories of the eugenics manifesto. In the 1950s, Gunnar Dahlberg gave his support to the UNESCO Statement on Race.

References

Bibliography

1893 births
1956 deaths
People from Västervik Municipality
Swedish geneticists
Swedish eugenicists
Burials at Uppsala old cemetery
20th-century Swedish physicians